Sam M. Mbulaiteye is a Ugandan physician-scientist and epidemiologist who researches Burkitt lymphoma. He is a senior investigator at the National Cancer Institute.

Life 
Mbulaiteye received physician training at Makerere University (1990) with advanced training in epidemiology and biostatistics (M.Phil.) from the University of Cambridge (1994), and specialist training in internal medicine (M.Med.) from Makerere University (1996). His early research focused on measuring the impact of HIV on cancer in patients at the Uganda Cancer Institute from 1994 and 1997 and investigating population trends of HIV in a general population in rural southwest Uganda while at the Uganda Virus Research Institute and U.K. Medical Research Council HIV program.

In December 2000, Mbulaiteye joined National Cancer Institute's (NCI) infections and immunoepidemiology branch (IIB) to focus his work on KS and Burkitt lymphoma (BL) as a research fellow, and was awarded NIH scientific tenure and appointed senior investigator in 2013. He conducts research to understand the etiology of BL. Mbulaiteye is the co-editor-in-chief of Infectious Agents and Cancer.

References 

Living people
Place of birth missing (living people)
Year of birth missing (living people)
Makerere University alumni
Alumni of the University of Cambridge
National Institutes of Health people
Physician-scientists
21st-century Ugandan physicians
Ugandan emigrants to the United States
Ugandan medical researchers
Cancer epidemiologists
HIV/AIDS researchers
Ugandan epidemiologists